L'École secondaire catholique Le Relais is a French-Language Catholic high school located in Alexandria, Ontario. It is managed by the Conseil scolaire de district catholique de l'Est ontarien.

References

External links
 École secondaire catholique Le Relais

Catholic secondary schools in Ontario
French-language high schools in Ontario
Schools in the United Counties of Stormont, Dundas and Glengarry